Hollein is a German surname. Notable people with the surname include:
 Hans Hollein (1934–2014), Austrian architect and designer and key figure of postmodern architecture
 Max Hollein (born 1969), Austrian art historian
 Nina Hollein (born 1971), Austrian author, architect, and fashion designer based in New York City

German-language surnames
Surnames of Austrian origin